Platner Brook is formed by two branches, the East Platner Brook and West Platner Brook. Platner Brook flows into the West Branch Delaware River by Fraser, New York.

References

Rivers of New York (state)
Rivers of Delaware County, New York
Tributaries of the West Branch Delaware River